Piezogenic papules are protrusions of fat just beneath skin.

Signs and symptoms
They present as multiple small or large bumps characteristically on the heels and wrists. Most are asymptomatic and pain is rare, although some may present with pain before the bumps are noticed. They generally occur bilaterally and display a yellowish to skin-color. They may feel soft or firm.

Cause and risks
The bumps are caused by pressure. There may be an association with Prader–Willi syndrome, and around a third of individuals with Ehlers–Danlos syndrome may have them. Risk factors include obesity, flat feet, athletics, figure skating, and long-distance running.

Diagnosis
Diagnosis is by its appearance. If present in a child it may appear similar to juvenile aponeurotic fibroma.

Treatment
Generally, no treatment is required. They usually disappear when pressure is relieved; avoidance of prolonged standing, taping foot, compression stockings, heel cups, padding devices.

Epidemiology
Piezogenic papules are relatively common; in one small population-based study, the prevalence was found to be 76%. The same study found that it was not unusual to demonstrate the bumps when pressing a person's wrist.

History
The term was first coined by W. B. Shelley and Rawnsley, who first described them in 1968.

See also
 List of cutaneous conditions

References

External links 

Skin conditions resulting from physical factors